The Kyrgyz Ground Forces, also commonly known as the Kyrgyz Army is the infantry branch of the Armed Forces of the Republic of Kyrgyzstan.

History 

In April 1992, Kyrgyzstan formed a State Committee for Defense Affairs, and in June the republic took control of all troops on its soil (meaning remaining units of the stationed in Kyrgyzstan). In 1994, 30 percent of the officer corps were ethnic Russians. The first commander was General Valentin Luk'yanov, an ethnic Ukrainian. On January 25, 2017, President Almazbek Atambayev officially founded the Kyrgyz Army, with Colonel Erlis Terdikbayev acting as its first commander.

Structure
Ground forces are divided into 2 military commands, the Northern and Southern Groups of Forces.

Northern Group of Forces
 8th Guards Motor Rifle Panfilov Division (Tokmok)
 2nd Guards Motor Rifle Frunze Brigade (Koy-Tash)
 Independent Tank Regiment
 Machine Gun Battalions (Karakol)
 Artillery Battalions (Naryn)
 Engineering Battalion
 Signals Battalion
 Scorpion 25th Special Forces Brigade (Tokmok)
 Artillery Brigade
 Balykchynsky Brigade
 Specialized units

Southern Group of Forces

 68th Independent Mountain Rifle Brigade (Osh)
 Armored Battalion (Ala-Buka District)
 Machine Gun and Artillery Battalion
 Mountain Rifle Battalion "Batken"
 24th Independent "Ilbirs" (Snow Leopard) Special Purpose Brigade (Kök-Janggak)
 Reconnaissance Battalion
 anti-aircraft artillery regiment
 parts and subdivisions of support, chemical protection, etc.

Equipment

Weapons 

 Makarov PM 9×18mm – sidearm
 AKM 7.62×39mm – service rifle
 AK-74 5.45×39mm – service rifle
 RPK 7.62×39mm – light machine gun
 SVD 7.62×54mmR – marksman/sniper rifle
 SKS 7.62×39mm – ceremonial rifle
 M4 carbine 5.56×45mm – service rifle and in service 
 MKE JNG-90 7.62×51mm – sniper rifle
 HAR-66 – rocket-propelled grenade and in service
 QBZ-95 –

Armor

References 

Military of Kyrgyzstan